All About Mothers is a 2018 French film written, directed and produced by Marie-Castille Mention-Schaar.

Cast

Production 

The shooting of the film began on September 21, 2017. For the scenes shot at the Élysée Palace, President Emmanuel Macron and Élysée officials agreed to lend the hallway and the courtyard. President François Hollande had allowed director Mention-Schaar to visit his private apartments before he left office. Having realized these were Haussmann-style apartments, Mention-Schaar found smaller similar apartments for the shooting. The desk was recreated in a Paris hôtel particulier with a decorum similar to Élysée's.

References

External links 
 
 
 La Fêtes des mères, UniFrance 

2018 films
French comedy-drama films
Films shot in Paris
2010s French-language films
2018 drama films
Films directed by Marie-Castille Mention-Schaar
2010s French films